Omar Moussa (born 30 August 1997) is a Burundian football player. He plays in Rwanda for Police Kibungo.

International
He made his Burundi national football team debut on 11 March 2017 in a friendly against Djibouti, as a starter.

He was selected for the country's 2019 Africa Cup of Nations squad.

References

External links
 
 
 

1997 births
Sportspeople from Bujumbura
Living people
Burundian footballers
Burundian expatriate footballers
Burundi international footballers
Association football defenders
Flambeau de l'Est FC players
Vital'O F.C. players
Bugesera FC players
Sofapaka F.C. players
Police F.C. (Rwanda) players
Kenyan Premier League players
Burundian expatriate sportspeople in Rwanda
Burundian expatriate sportspeople in Kenya
Expatriate footballers in Rwanda
Expatriate footballers in Kenya
2019 Africa Cup of Nations players